Duncan is a town in Bolivar County, Mississippi, United States. Per the 2020 census, the population was 276.

History
Duncan is named for an early "leading citizen."

Geography

Demographics

2020 census

Note: the US Census treats Hispanic/Latino as an ethnic category. This table excludes Latinos from the racial categories and assigns them to a separate category. Hispanics/Latinos can be of any race.

2000 Census
As of the census of 2000, there were 578 people, 177 households, and 124 families residing in the town. The population density was 620.7 people per square mile (240.0/km2). There were 186 housing units at an average density of 199.7 per square mile (77.2/km2). The racial makeup of the town was 19.55% White, 77.51% African American, 2.25% from other races, and 0.69% from two or more races. Hispanic or Latino of any race were 3.11% of the population.

There were 177 households, out of which 42.4% had children under the age of 18 living with them, 36.2% were married couples living together, 26.0% had a female householder with no husband present, and 29.4% were non-families. 24.3% of all households were made up of individuals, and 11.3% had someone living alone who was 65 years of age or older. The average household size was 2.95 and the average family size was 3.47.

In the town, the population was spread out, with 33.4% under the age of 18, 7.1% from 18 to 24, 25.1% from 25 to 44, 18.3% from 45 to 64, and 16.1% who were 65 years of age or older. The median age was 33 years. For every 100 females, there were 87.7 males. For every 100 females age 18 and over, there were 86.9 males.

The median income for a household in the town was $14,286, and the median income for a family was $16,875. Males had a median income of $24,750 versus $11,429 for females. The per capita income for the town was $8,329. About 51.1% of families and 58.6% of the population were below the poverty line, including 75.4% of those under age 18 and 29.6% of those age 65 or over.

Education
Duncan is served by the North Bolivar Consolidated School District, formerly known as the North Bolivar School District until it consolidated in 2014.

Students are zoned to Brooks Elementary School in Duncan, as it belonged to the pre-consolidation North Bolivar School District, and Northside High School (the only secondary school in the district) in Shelby.

Northside High opened in 2018 after Broad Street High School in Shelby consolidated into it. Shelby Middle School closed in 2018.

Notable people
Eddie C. Campbell, musician
Bobby Crespino, former tight end for the Cleveland Browns and New York Giants
Willie Love, musician

Further reading
Miles, Loyce Braswell.  “Duncan, Mississippi: The Origins and Survival of a Town,” Journal of the Bolivar County Historical Society, pp. 5–7 (March 1983).

References

Towns in Bolivar County, Mississippi
Towns in Mississippi